Hymenoxys robusta is a South American species of flowering plant in the daisy family. It has been found primarily in Bolivia with a few populations in nearby Peru and Argentina.

Hymenoxys robusta is a foul-smelling perennial with a branching root. Leaves remain attached to the stem after they die and turn black. Flower heads contain disc flowers but no ray flowers.

References

External links
Photo of specimen at Missouri Botanical Garden, collected in Cochabamba in 1893

robusta
Flora of Bolivia
Flora of Peru
Flora of Argentina
Plants described in 1883